The Spring Street station is a local station on the IND Eighth Avenue Line of the New York City Subway. Located at Spring Street and Sixth Avenue (Avenue of the Americas) in the Hudson Square and SoHo neighborhoods of lower Manhattan, it is served by the C and E trains, the former of which is replaced by the A train during late nights.

History
The station opened on September 10, 1932, as part of the city-operated Independent Subway System (IND)'s initial segment, the Eighth Avenue Line between Chambers Street and 207th Street. Extensions southward in 1933 and 1936 brought direct access to Brooklyn on the IND Fulton Street Line, while service from Spring Street to Queens became possible with the opening of the IND Queens Boulevard Line on August 19, 1933 to Jackson Heights.

The station was renovated as part of the 2010–2014 MTA Capital Program. An MTA study conducted in 2014 found that 31% of station components were out of date.

Station layout

Like most local subway stations, Spring Street has two side platforms and four tracks. The two center express tracks are used by the A train during daytime hours. A crossunder just within fare control allows a free transfer between directions.

Wall tiling suggests that fare controls and a crossunder have been removed from the north end of the station. The platforms have a blue trim line on a dark blue border (ultramarine blue and cobalt blue, with replacement tiles at the north end that are ultramarine blue and navy blue). The name tablets consist of "SPRING ST" in white sans-serif font on a dark blue background with a lighter blue border. Beneath the trim line and name tablets are "SPRING" and directional signs in white lettering on a black border tiled onto the walls. Blue I-beam columns run along the entire length of both platforms, with every other one having the standard black and white station signs.

Exits
All fare control areas are at platform level. The station's main ones are at the south end of the platform.  Each contains banks of regular and HEET turnstiles, a token booth, and a single staircase going up to Spring Street and Sixth Avenue. The one on the northbound side is built inside the headquarters for God's Love We Deliver and leads to the northeast corner while the one on the southbound side leads to the northwest corner. The southbound platform has an un-staffed HEET entrance that has a single staircase going up to the southwest corner of Vandam Street and Sixth Avenue. There are also closed fare control areas at the north end of the station, which led to all four corners of the intersection of Prince Street/Charlton Street and Sixth Avenue.

Artwork

In December 1984, Chilean artist Alfredo Jaar rented all the ad space in the station for the month, and put up an installation he called "Rushes", which showed 81 photos he had taken of poor Brazilian workers digging in Serra Pelada, a government-run gold mine. Scattered amongst them were signs giving world oil prices.

The 1994 artwork installed at the stairway of the northbound platform's fare control is a large, lively mosaic called New York City Subway Station by Edith Kramer. It consists of a single painting depicting 14th Street–Union Square on the IRT Lexington Avenue Line.

References

External links 

 
 nycsubway.org — New York Subway Station Artwork by Edith Kramer (1994)
 Station Reporter — C Train
 Station Reporter — E Train
 Spring Street entrance from Google Maps Street View
 Vandam Street entrance from Google Maps Street View
 Platform from Google Maps Street View

IND Eighth Avenue Line stations
Sixth Avenue
New York City Subway stations in Manhattan
Railway stations in the United States opened in 1932
1932 establishments in New York City
SoHo, Manhattan
Hudson Square